Ököritófülpös is a village in Szabolcs-Szatmár-Bereg county, in the Northern Great Plain region of eastern Hungary.

History
In 1910, a fire in a barn during a dancing-party killed 312 people.

Geography

References

Populated places in Szabolcs-Szatmár-Bereg County